No. 1 Flying Training Wing currently based at SLAF China Bay, carries out basic pilot training of the Sri Lanka Air Force. It is the oldest flying formation in the SLAF.

History
The roots of the Wing goes back to the formation of the Royal Ceylon Air Force when pilot training began with de Havilland Canada DHC-1 Chipmunks in 1950. However the No 1 Squadron was formally established with the creation of it for pilot training and No 2 Squadron for transport in 1955. Both were base at RAF Negambo. In the 1963 the squadron became the No. 1 Flying Training School and moved to RCyAF China Bay in 1963 and in 1971 took up advanced training and later was upgraded to an Air Wing. In August 1988 the unit was moved to SLAF Anuradhapura due to the Civil War, however it has been shifted back to SLAF China Bay in 2009.

In March 2001, on the 50th anniversary of the Sri Lanka Air Force the unit was presented the President’s Colours.

In 2018 May, brand new six PT-6 training aircraft accepted from AVIC Hongdu in Nanchang, China. These aircraft will replace the old air frames.

Role
 Basic flying training for SLAF flight cadets
 Advanced and Fighter Conversion training course
 Basic Air Traffic Control course
 Limited Air Defence through karakorum-8 in interceptor role

Aircraft operated
Year of introduction
 Cessna 150
 Nanchang CJ-6
 karakorum-8
 SIAI Marchetti SF.260W - Retired
 Boulton Paul Balliol - Retired
 de Havilland Canada DHC-1 Chipmunk - Retired

Notable members
Air Vice Marshal E. R. Amarasekara, DFC & BAR, RCyAF - former Commander of the Air Force (1962–1970)
Air Chief Marshal Deshamanya Paddy Mendis, MBIM, IDC, psc, SLAF - former Commander of the Air Force  (1971–1976)
Air Chief Marshal Harry Goonatilake, USP, ndc, psc, SLAF - former Commander of the Air Force  (1976–1981)
Air Commodore Shirantha Goonatilake, RWP, RSP, SLAF - Commanding Officer Flying Training Wing

Gallery

References

 Sri Lanka Air Force Base Anuradhapura
 Early Wings, SLAF
 Award of Colours to SLAF Base Anuradhapura

Sri Lanka Air Force Wings
Military units and formations established in 1955
1955 establishments in Ceylon